Locust Township may refer to the following townships in the United States:

 Locust Township, Christian County, Illinois
 Locust Township, Columbia County, Pennsylvania